Roger William Rayson (born 17 February 1942) is a former Australian cricketer who played 124 matches for the Melbourne Cricket Club from 1963–64 to 1974–75, and played 18 first-class matches for Victoria.

Cricket
His father, Maxwell Rayson, played three matches for Victoria in the 1937/38 season, and his grandfather, William Rayson, played six games for the state between the 1924/25 and 1928/29 seasons.

A left-arm wrist-spinner, Rayson took his best bowling figures against South Australia in 1965–66, with figures of 6 for 97 and 4 for 91 in the drawn match.

References

External links
 
 Victorian Cricket Association: Batting Career Report: Roger W. Rayson (Melbourne Cricket Club)
 Victorian Cricket Association: Bowling Career Report: Roger W. Rayson (Melbourne Cricket Club)

1942 births
Living people
Victoria cricketers
People educated at Caulfield Grammar School
Melbourne Cricket Club cricketers
Australian cricketers
Cricketers from Melbourne
People from Windsor, Victoria